Mount Austin may refer to:

 Mount Austin (Antarctica), a mountain
 Mount Austin (Hong Kong), a hill also known as Victoria Peak
 Mount Austin, Johor Bahru, a residential area in Johor Bahru, Johor, Malaysia
 Mount Austin, New South Wales, a suburb of Wagga Wagga
 , a British steamship